geoPublish is a desktop publishing program designed by Berkeley Softworks for the GEOS environment.

A version for on the Commodore 64 was released in 1986.
It was ported to the Apple II in 1988.

Though not as sophisticated as contemporary counterparts such as PageMaker, geoPublish is capable of outputting PostScript page descriptions to laser printers and is used for creating newsletters and other basic page layout tasks.

External links
geoPublish manual

References

1986 software
Desktop publishing software
Commodore 64 software
Apple II software
Apple II word processors